Ashleigh Rondón (born 30 December 1998) is an American-raised Dominican footballer who plays as a forward for college team East Texas Baptist Tigers and the Dominican Republic women's national team.

Early life
Rondón was raised in Carrollton, Texas.

College career
Rondón has attended the East Texas Baptist University in Marshall, Texas.

International career
Rondón made her senior debut for the Dominican Republic on 18 February 2021 as a 67th-minute substitution in a 1–1 friendly home draw against Puerto Rico.

References

1998 births
Living people
Dominican Republic women's footballers
Women's association football forwards
Women's association football midfielders
Dominican Republic women's international footballers
People from Carrollton, Texas
Soccer players from Texas
American women's soccer players
East Texas Baptist Tigers women's soccer players
American sportspeople of Dominican Republic descent
African-American women's soccer players
21st-century African-American sportspeople
21st-century African-American women